Wyoming Highway 295 (WYO 295) is a  north-south Wyoming state road located in northeastern Park County and western Big Horn County. All but  of the route are located in Park County; the southernmost intersection on the highway is in Big Horn County instead. Although predominately a north-south highway, WYO 295 travels east-west for its first 8.7 miles.

Route description

Big Horn County to Powell
Wyoming Highway 295 begins its southern (or eastern) end at Wyoming Highway 32 (Emblem Highway) in western Big Horn County, east-southeast of Powell. Highway 295 crosses into Park County at just over four-tenths of a mile and travels westward till it reaches the community of Willwood at approximately 8.7 miles. Here WYO 295 turns north and is the general direction for the remainder of its course. This highway is an important travel corridor for Powell to Greybull traffic. Highway 295 crosses the Shoshone River just north of Willwood, and reaches the southern city limits of Powell at just over 12 miles. WYO 295 enters Powell from the south on S. Fair Street and curves gently onto E. South Street before turning north onto S. Bent Street for a short distance. US Route 14 Alternate (Coulter Avenue) is met at approximately 12.5 miles. Here Highway 295 turns west to join US 14A for quick one block concurrency before leaving US 14A to head north on N. Absaroka Street.

Powell to Elk Basin
Wyoming Highway 295 travels along N. Absaroka Street, passing near Northwest College, before leaving the small city traveling due north. Eight miles north of Powell, WYO 295 passes east of the Powell Municipal Airport, a general aviation airport, which can be accessed from the highway. Past the airport, WYO 295 gently turns slightly to the north-northwest and will reach its northern terminus in Elk Basin after . Elk Basin is an active oil field with hundreds of derricks operating in it. The roadway continues northward as Park County Route 1NG to the Montana state line.

Major intersections

References

External links 

Wyoming State Routes 200-299
WYO 295 - WYO 32 to US 14 Alt
WYO 295 - US 14 Alt in Powell
WYO 295 - US 14 Alt to WYO 120

Transportation in Big Horn County, Wyoming
Transportation in Park County, Wyoming
295